Lorrie is a usually feminine name which may refer to:

Given name or shortened name
 Lorrie Collins (1942–2018), American country music, rockabilly and rock-and-roll singer
 Lorrie Cranor, American professor and director of the Carnegie Mellon University Usable Privacy and Security Laboratory
 Lorrie Dunington-Grubb (1877–1945), English landscape architect in Canada
 Lorrie Fair (born 1978), American soccer player
 Lorrie Lynch, journalist and senior editor of USA Weekend magazine through 2009
 Lorrie Menconi, Playboy Playmate of the month for February 1969
 Lorrie Moore (born 1957), American fiction writer
 Lorrie Morgan (born 1959), American country music singer
 Lorrie Otto (1919–2010), American environmentalist and author
 Lorrie Pickering (1919–2009), New Zealand politician, Minister of Education in 1972
 Lorrie Sprecher (born 1960), American writer and musician
 Lorrie Wilmot (1943–2004), South African cricketer

Pseudonym or nickname
 Irène Hamoir, Belgian author and surrealist referred to as "Lorrie" in the writings of her husband, Louis Scutenaire, and also in the works of René Magritte

See also
 Laurie (disambiguation)
 Lori (disambiguation)
 Lorie (disambiguation)
 Lorri (disambiguation)
 Lorry (disambiguation)
 Lory (disambiguation)

Feminine given names
Hypocorisms